El Affroun العفرون البليدة is a town and commune in Blida Province, Algeria. According to the 2022 census it has a population of 42,627

.

References

Communes of Blida Province
Blida Province